Prætextatus or Praetextatus may refer to:
Prætextatus (Bishop of Rouen), also known as Saint Prix
Vettius Agorius Praetextatus, 4th-century Roman aristocrat
 Gaius Asinius Lepidus Praetextatus, Roman consul in 242

See also
 Praetexta, a type of Roman historical drama